The Australian Mathematical Sciences Institute (AMSI) was established in 2002 for collaboration in the mathematical sciences to strengthen mathematics and statistics, especially in universities.

The Fields Institute and the Pacific Institute for the Mathematical Sciences have influenced AMSI's structure and operations.

AMSI has a membership that includes most Australian universities, CSIRO, the Australian Bureau of Statistics, the Bureau of Meteorology and the Defence Science and Technology Organisation. AMSI is located at Monash University.

Activities
AMSI pursues its mission through its three key program areas: 
 School Education 
 Research & Higher Education 
 Industry, Business & Government

School Education Program 
AMSI's School Education program was established in 2004 under the International Centre of Excellence for Education in Mathematics (ICE-EM). Through ICE-EM, a sequence of mathematics texts, teacher resources, and professional development for school years 5–10 were developed.

In 2009, the Department of Education, Employment and Workplace Relations provided funding for the extension of ICE-EM activities under the Improving Mathematics Education in Schools (TIMES) project. This funded an expansion of the teaching professional development program across Australia, the development of teacher resource modules for years 5–10, and Maths: Make your career count—a suite of materials to promote careers in mathematics.

In work by Frank Barrington and Peter Brown, ICE-EM collected and published data on national enrolments in mathematics at year 12 and made a careful state-by-state comparison of year 12 curricula.

Research & Higher Education Program

Research 
The AMSI Research Program expands and improves the mathematical sciences research base in Australia. The program promotes collaboration between member institutions and with international researchers and gives students at member institutions networking opportunities.

AMSI provides workshop sponsorship allocated through its Scientific Advisory Committee to AMSI members. AMSI also sponsors annual AMSI Lecturers and the Australian MS Mahler Lecturer.

Funding from the Department of Education, Science and Training enabled the establishment of the AMSI Access Grid Room (AGR) network. The AGR network facilitates distributed lectures, teaching, and research. A national program of collaborative teaching of advanced mathematics at honors level at multiple remote sites is now established.

Industry, Business and Government Program 
AMSI highlights the relevance of mathematics to industry through wide-ranging industry-linked activities including:
 AMSI's internship program
 Industry workshops
 Mathematical and statistical consulting services
The activities showcase the benefits of using mathematical tools in business, industry and government.

AMSI Intern 
AMSI Intern is a national program that links postgraduate students and their university supervisors across all disciplines with industry partners through short-term 4-5 month tightly focused partner research internships. The postgraduate student is supported by an academic mentor from the host university throughout the internship placement period.

Members

Full Members 
Australian National University
La Trobe University
Monash University
Queensland University of Technology
RMIT University
University of Melbourne
University of Queensland
University of New South Wales
University of Newcastle
University of Sydney
University of Adelaide
University of Western Australia

Associate Members 
Charles Sturt University
Curtin University of Technology
Deakin University
James Cook University
Flinders University
Griffith University
Macquarie University
Queensland University of Technology
Swinburne University of Technology
University of Ballarat
University of Canberra
University of New England
University of South Australia
University of Southern Queensland
University of Tasmania
University of Technology Sydney
University of Wollongong
Western Sydney University

Society and Agency Members 
Australian Bureau of Statistics
Australian Mathematical Society and ANZIAM
Australian Mathematics Trust
Bureau of Meteorology
CSIRO
DST Group

References

Mathematical institutes
Research institutes in Australia
Organizations established in 2002